Digulia is a monotypic genus of hoverfly from the family Syrphidae, in the order Diptera. The single species, D. kochi, is found in New Guinea.

References

Hoverfly genera
Monotypic Diptera genera
Eristalinae
Insects of New Guinea
Diptera of Australasia